Bayırköy (literally "hill village") is a Turkish place name and may refer to the following places in Turkey:

 Bayırköy, Alanya, a village in Alanya district, Antalya Province
 Bayırköy, Bilecik, a village in the central district of Bilecik Province
 Bayırköy, Daday
 Bayırköy, Gelibolu
 Bayırköy, Gündoğmuş, a village in Gündoğmuş district, Antalya Province
 Bayırköy, Hınıs
 Bayırköy, Kızılcahamam, a village in Kızılcahamam district, Ankara Province
 Bayırköy, Kulp
 Bayırköy, Orhangazi

See also 
 Bayırköy (disambiguation), literally "hill"
 Bayırlı (disambiguation), literally "place with hill(s)"